Kâzım Pasha may refer to:

 Kâzım Sevüktekin (1877–1949), Turkish general
 Kâzım İnanç (1880–1938), Turkish general
 Kâzım Dirik (1881–1941), Turkish general
 Kâzım Karabekir (1882–1948), Turkish general
 Kâzım Özalp (1882–1968), Turkish general
 Kâzım Orbay (1887–1964), Turkish general
 Kazim Pasha (director), Pakistani TV director